Giraffa priscilla is an extinct species of Miocene giraffe that lived on the Indian subcontinent. In 2014, new fossil remains were described in Pakistan.

References

Miocene even-toed ungulates
Miocene mammals of Asia
Prehistoric giraffes
Fossil taxa described in 1911